Susan Menard (died  September 2022) was an American politician who served as the 31st mayor of Woonsocket, Rhode Island, from 1995 to 2009. She was the first female mayor and longest serving mayor in Woonsocket history.

Career
Menard first was elected to the Woonsocket School Committee in 1981. She was later elected to the Woonsocket City Council and became its first female president. She was urged into politics by Douglas Brown, a former member of the School Committee. Menard was elected as mayor of Woonsocket in 1995, beating opponent Vincent Ward. She served until 2009, making her the longest serving mayor in the city's history. She is one of only four female mayors ever elected in Rhode Island.

Personal life and death
On April 14, 2009, the same year she left office, Menard's daughter Carrie Pilavin died aged 31. On September 17, 2022, Menard's older brother Robert Miller died, aged 81. She was listed as alive in his obituary.

Menard had a long-term relationship with Daniel Grabowski. On September 20, 2022, both of their bodies were found in Menard's home. Menard is survived by her sister Marilyn and grandchildren Jacob, Nathan, Madison and Colin.   Autopsy reports revealed that Menard had died of chronic obstructive pulmonary disease and Grabowski of type-2 diabetes.

References 

Year of birth missing
20th-century births
2022 deaths
Women mayors of places in the United States
People from Woonsocket, Rhode Island
School board members in Rhode Island
Deaths from chronic obstructive pulmonary disease
Mayors of places in Rhode Island